Lienau is a German language habitational surname for someone from any of various places called Lienow. Notable people with the name include:
 Detlef Lienau (1818–1887), German architect
 Jacob August Lienau (1854–1906), American architect
 Marianne Lienau (1935–2021), German presenter, radio journalist and contributing editor
 Robert Lienau (1838–1920), German music publisher

References 

German-language surnames
German toponymic surnames